Aquilla Independent School District is a public school district based in Aquilla, Texas (US). The district operates one high school, Aquilla High School, that serves students in grades pre-kindergarten through twelve.

Finances
As of the 2010–2011 school year, the appraised valuation of property in the district was $52,154,000. The maintenance tax rate was $0.117 and the bond tax rate was $0.007 per $100 of appraised valuation.

Academic achievement
In 2011, the school district was rated "recognized" by the Texas Education Agency.  Thirty-five percent of districts in Texas in 2011 received the same rating. No state accountability ratings will be given to districts in 2012. A school district in Texas can receive one of four possible rankings from the Texas Education Agency: Exemplary (the highest possible ranking), Recognized, Academically Acceptable, and Academically Unacceptable (the lowest possible ranking).

Historical district TEA accountability ratings
2011: Recognized
2010: Recognized
2009: Exemplary
2008: Exemplary
2007: Recognized
2006: Academically Acceptable
2005: Academically Acceptable
2004: Recognized

Schools
In the 2011–2012 school year, the district had students in two schools. 
Aquilla School (Grades PK-12)
Hill County JJAEP (Grades 6-12)

Special programs

Athletics
Aquilla High School participates in the boys sports of baseball, basketball, and football. The school participates in the girls sport of basketball. For the 2012 through 2014 school years, Aquilla High School will play six-man football in Class 1A 6-man Football Division I.

See also

List of school districts in Texas
List of high schools in Texas

References

External links
Aquilla ISD

School districts in Hill County, Texas